Hazleton by Fuel was released in 1997. The EP was sold at some 1997 shows. It was recorded at C&C in Hazleton, Pennsylvania.

Track listing 

 "Bittersweet" - 3:32
 "Jesus or a Gun" - 3:34
 "It's Come to This" - 3:23
 "King for a Day" - 3:44

Personnel 

 Brett Scallions - lead vocals, rhythm guitar
 Carl Bell - lead guitar, backing vocals
 Jeff Abercrombie - bass 
 Jody Abbott - drums

1998 EPs
Fuel (band) albums
Epic Records EPs